St. Theodora of Sihla (born  1650 – d. ?) is a Romanian Christian Orthodox saint, commemorated on August 7.

Life 
Born in Vânători-Neamț, Neamț County during the reign of Vasile Lupu, she was the daughter of the chief armourer of Neamț Citadel, the boyar Ștefan Joldea. In her youth, she was married off against her will. Being childless, both she and her husband decide to embrace monasticism, he withdrawing to Poiana Mărului monastery under the name Elfterie, and she to Vărzărești.

Foreign invasions prompt her to retreat into the Buzău Mountains (she is said to have also passed through the woodland hermitage Fundătura), where she lived for nearly a decade (her name is mentioned in an inscription on the altar stone of the woodland hermitage at New Agaton). From here she went firstly to Neamț monastery, where she was guided towards Sihăstria hermitage, in the Neamț Mountains. With the guidance of Sihăstria's abbot, and with the blessing of the hermitage's egumen, she ascended the mountains to become an anchorite in the Sihla wilderness. The word "sihlă" means thick forest of young trees; thicket. Over a century later, Calistrat Hogaș described the hermit's environment:

 "Dacă Sihla nu pășește dincolo de marginile firești, apoi are cel puțin însușirea de a atinge aproape culmea de asprime, singurătate și sălbăticie a celei mai puternice închipuiri."

 "If Sihla does not surpass eartly imagination, it is about as harsh, lonely, and wild a place as one could possibly conceive."

Theodora initially lived in a cottage in a rocky part of Sihla, left to her by an elderly monk. Oral tradition recounts that nuns fleeing from foreign invasions came across the saint's cottage, who relinquished it to move into a cave, even more remote than her initial abode.

Posthumous legacy 

After her death, the body of the St. Theodora remained in the cave in which she had spent the greater part of her hermitage. The knowledge of her life and death is said to have reached her husband, who left Poiana Mărului and came to spend the last decade of his life at Sihăstria, close to his wife's resting place. Around 1725, Sihla monastery was founded in her memory.

She remained buried there until circa 1828-1834 when, during the Russian occupation of the Romanian Principalities, she was translated to Lavra Pecerska in Kiev.

The Romanian writer Calistrat Hogaș wrote about her in his book "Pe drumuri de munte"("On mountain paths"):

The Synod of the Romanian Orthodox Church proclaimed the canonization of St. Theodora of Sihla on June 20, 1992, establishing her commemoration on August 7.

References

Bibliography 
 Sf. Cuvioasă Teodora de la Sihla - Viața și nevoințele, rext preluat din Pr. Prof. Dr. Constantin Galeriu, Sfinți români și apărători ai Legii strămoșești, Editura - Institutului Biblic și de Misiune al Bisericii Ortodoxe Române, București, 1987, p. 432-442, Cuvioasa Teodora de la Sihla
 Dicționar Religios, Ion M. Stoian, Ed. Garamond, 1994
 Balan, Ioanichie, Sfânta Teodora de la Sihla, Editura Mănăstirea Sihăstria, 2004.

External links 
 Teodora de la Sihla, OrthodoxWiki
 Sfânta Teodora de la Sihla, 25 May 2012, Pr. Prof. Dr. Mircea Păcurariu, CrestinOrtodox.ro
 Prima româncă trecută în rândul sfinților, 7 August 2007, Nicoleta Olaru, Ziarul Lumina
 Mireasa lui Hristos din Munții Neamțului, 7 August 2008, Narcisa Elena Balaban, Ziarul Lumina
 Cuvioasa desăvârșită în pustiul Sihlei, 7 August 2010, Silviu Dascălu, Ziarul Lumina
 Panteon creștin - Cuvioasa Teodora, 24 April 2002, Revista Magazin
 Viata Sfintei Teodora de la Sihla, 24 July 2013, CrestinOrtodox.ro
 Sfânta Cuvioasa Teodora de la Sihla, 7 August 2009, CrestinOrtodox.ro
 Peștera Sfintei Teodora de la Sihla, 2 July 2012, Teodor Dănălache, CrestinOrtodox.ro

1650 births
Year of death unknown
17th-century Romanian people
17th-century Eastern Orthodox nuns
Eastern Orthodox saints
Romanian saints
17th-century Romanian women
People from Neamț County